is a railway station located in the city of Itō, Shizuoka, Japan operated by the East Japan Railway Company (JR East), with the Izukyū Corporation's Izu Kyūkō Line as a tenant running a through service. It also has a  freight depot for the Japan Freight Railway Company.

Lines
Itō Station is the terminal station of the Itō Line, and is located 16.9 kilometers from the opposing terminus of the line at Atami Station and 121.5 kilometers from Tokyo Station.

Station layout
Itō Station has a single island platform serving Track 1 and Track 2 and a single side platform serving Track 3. The platforms are connected by an underpass. The Izu Kyūkō trains use the outer Tracks 1 and 3, whereas the Itō Line pulls into Track 2, and reverses out in the opposite direction. The station building has automated ticket machines and Suica and PASMO automated turnstiles as well as a "Midori no Madoguchi" staffed ticket office.

Platforms

History 
Itō Station opened on December 15, 1938 when the section of the Itō Line linking  with Itō was completed. On December 10, 1961, Izu Kyūkō began operations on a line linking Itō with Shimoda. Freight services were discontinued from October 1, 1980, but were resumed on March 31, 1987. On April 1, 1987 along with division and privatization of the Japan National Railway, East Japan Railway Company started operating this station.

Passenger statistics
In fiscal 2017, the JR portion of station was used by an average of 7822 passengers daily (boarding passengers only). The Izukyu portion of the station was used by 5316 passengers daily (boarding passengers only).

Surrounding area
 Itō Onsen

See also
 List of Railway Stations in Japan

References

External links

 Official home page

Railway stations in Japan opened in 1938
Railway stations in Shizuoka Prefecture
Itō Line
Izu Kyūkō Line
Stations of East Japan Railway Company
Stations of Japan Freight Railway Company
Itō, Shizuoka